The 2018 Koblenz Open was a professional tennis tournament played on indoor hard courts. It was the second edition of the tournament which was part of the 2018 ATP Challenger Tour. It took place in Koblenz, Germany between 16 and 21 January 2018.

Singles main-draw entrants

Seeds

 1 Rankings are as of 8 January 2018.

Other entrants
The following players received wildcards into the singles main draw:
  Jan Choinski
  Benjamin Hassan
  Marvin Möller
  Mats Moraing

The following players received entry into the singles main draw as alternates:
  Ilya Ivashka
  Tommy Robredo
  Sergiy Stakhovsky

The following players received entry from the qualifying draw:
  Joris De Loore
  Christopher Heyman
  Filip Horanský
  Mikael Ymer

Champions

Singles

 Mats Moraing def.  Kenny de Schepper 6–2, 6–1.

Doubles

 Romain Arneodo /  Tristan-Samuel Weissborn def.  Sander Arends /  Antonio Šančić 6–7(4–7), 7–5, [10–6].

External links
 Official website

2018 ATP Challenger Tour
2018
2018 in German tennis